Limpias is a municipality located in the autonomous community of Cantabria, Spain. According to the 2007 census, the city has a population of 1,497 inhabitants.

References

External links
Limpias - Cantabria 102 Municipios

Municipalities in Cantabria